West Sussex (formally the Western division of Sussex) was a parliamentary constituency in the county of Sussex, which returned two Members of Parliament to the House of Commons of the Parliament of the United Kingdom, elected by the bloc vote system.

It was created under the Great Reform Act for the 1832 general election, and abolished for the 1885 general election.

Boundaries
1832–1885: The Rapes of Arundel, Bramber and Chichester.

Members of Parliament

Election results

Elections in the 1830s

Elections in the 1840s

Wyndham resigned by accepting the office of Steward of the Chiltern Hundreds, causing a by-election.

Elections in the 1850s

Prime resigned by accepting the office of Steward of the Chiltern Hundreds, causing a by-election.

Gordon-Lennox was appointed President of the Poor Law Board, requiring a by-election.

Elections in the 1860s
Gordon-Lennox succeeded to the peerage, becoming 6th Duke of Richmond and causing a by-election.

Wyndham succeeded to the peerage, becoming 2nd Baron Leconfield and causing a by-election.

Elections in the 1870s

Elections in the 1880s

References 

Politics of West Sussex
Parliamentary constituencies in South East England (historic)
Constituencies of the Parliament of the United Kingdom established in 1832
Constituencies of the Parliament of the United Kingdom disestablished in 1885